Twelve national teams competed in the men's field hockey tournament at the 2018 Asian Games in Indonesia. Eighteen players were officially enrolled in each squad.

Pool A

The following is the India roster in the men's field hockey tournament of the 2018 Asian Games.

Head coach:  Harendra Singh

Harmanpreet Singh 
Dilpreet Singh
Rupinder Pal Singh
Surender Kumar
Manpreet Singh
Sardara Singh
Simranjeet Singh
Mandeep Singh
Lalit Upadhyay
P. R. Sreejesh (C, GK)
Krishan Pathak (GK)
Varun Kumar
S. V. Sunil
Birendra Lakra
Akashdeep Singh
Chinglensana Singh
Amit Rohidas
Vivek Prasad

The following is the South Korea roster in the men's field hockey tournament of the 2018 Asian Games.

Head coach:  Kim Young-kyu

Hong Doo-pyo (GK)
Lee Se-yong (GK)
Rim Jin-kang
Yang Ji-hun
Jung Man-jae (C)
Hwang Weon-ki
Hwang Tae-il
Kim Jung-hoo
Lee Jung-jun
Seo In-woo
Bae Jong-suk
Jeong Jun-woo
Kim Seong-kyu
Kim Hyeong-jin
Kim Sung-yeob
Lee Dae-yeol
Jang Jong-hyun
Kim Ki-hoon

The following is the Japan roster in the men's field hockey tournament of the 2018 Asian Games.

Head coach:  Siegfried Aikman

Koji Yamasaki
Genki Mitani
<li value=5>Seren Tanaka
<li value=6>Hiromasa Ochiai
<li value=7>Kazuma Murata
<li value=8>Suguru Hoshi
<li value=9>Kenta Tanaka
<li value=11>Kenji Kitazato
<li value=13>Manabu Yamashita (C)
<li value=14>Kaito Tanaka
<li value=17>Kentaro Fukuda
<li value=20>Masaki Ohashi
<li value=25>Shota Yamada
<li value=28>Yusuke Takano (GK)
<li value=29>Hirotaka Zendana
<li value=30>Takashi Yoshikawa (GK)
<li value=31>Kota Watanabe
<li value=32>Yoshiki Kirishita

{{fh|SRI}}
The following is the Sri Lanka roster in the men's field hockey tournament at the 2018 Asian Games. The team consists of 18 athletes.

<li value=1>Chamilka Mahabaduge (GK)
<li value=2>Dhammika Ranasingha
<li value=3>Ishanka Doranegala (C)
<li value=4>Pushpa Hendeniya
<li value=6>Harindra Dharmarathna
<li value=7>Tharanga Gunawardana
<li value=9>Sanjeewe Malegodagamage
<li value=10>Vipul Warnakula
<li value=11>Sandaruwan Sudusinghe
<li value=12>Nalantha Karunamunige
<li value=13>Rajitha Kulathunga
<li value=15>Gihan Rathnayake
<li value=17>Ravidu Bothale
<li value=20>Pramudya Fernando
<li value=22>Dinesh Don Abraham
<li value=23>Lahiru Panthie
<li value=29>Tharindu Hendeniya (GK)
<li value=30>Anuradha Rathnayake

{{fh|HKG}}
The following is the Hong Kong roster in the men's field hockey tournament of the 2018 Asian Games.

Head coach:  Fabian Gregory

<li value=1>Chan Hou-Fong (GK)
<li value=2>Tse Man Chun
<li value=4>Felix Iu Chi Him
<li value=6>Yu Chi Wai
<li value=7>Yu Chun Hin
<li value=11>Chan Ka Chun
<li value=12>Chuen Kwun Wa
<li value=13>Angus Chan
<li value=15>Tso Tsz Fung
<li value=16>Michael Chung Yan Chun (GK)
<li value=17>Davis Kwok Chun Ting
<li value=19>Gabriel Tsoi
<li value=20>Siu Chung Ming (C)
<li value=21>Windfall Monthong
<li value=22>Ho Ching
<li value=23>Martin Tsang
<li value=27>Marco Yu
<li value=28>Jasper Au

{{fh|INA}}
The following is the Indonesia roster in the men's field hockey tournament of the 2018 Asian Games.

Head coach:  Lim Chow Chuan

<li value=1>Wahid Hakim
<li value=2>Sadli Septiansyah
<li value=4>Nanda Rahman
<li value=5>Daarul Quthni
<li value=6>Iexy Kristianto
<li value=7>Richard Aunalal
<li value=11>Ardam
<li value=14>Hendri Mulia
<li value=15>Alfandy Prastyo
<li value=17>Jerry Efendi
<li value=18>Budi Romansyah (C)
<li value=21>Bara Audah
<li value=22>Astri Rahmad
<li value=23>Aulia Al Ardh
<li value=24>Gamma Rahmatullah
<li value=25>Ahmad Hikmat (GK)
<li value=29>Dea Dwi Permana (GK)
<li value=32>Haris Siregar

Pool B

{{fh|MAS}}
The following is the Malaysia roster in the men's field hockey tournament of the 2018 Asian Games.

Head coach:  Stephen van Huizen

<li value=6>Marhan Jalil
<li value=7>Fitri Saari
<li value=9>Joel van Huizen
<li value=10>Faizal Saari
<li value=11>Syed Syafiq Syed Cholan
<li value=12>Sukri Mutalib (C)
<li value=13>Firhan Ashaari
<li value=14>Amirul Aideed
<li value=15>Nabil Fiqri
<li value=16>Kumar Subramaniam (GK)
<li value=17>Razie Rahim
<li value=18>Faiz Helmi Jali
<li value=19>Azri Hassan
<li value=20>Meor Azuan Hassan
<li value=23>Tengku Ahmad Tajuddin
<li value=24>Nik Aiman Nik Rozemi
<li value=26>Shahril Saabah
<li value=29>Hairi Rahman (GK)

{{fh|PAK}}
The following is the Pakistan roster in the men's field hockey tournament of the 2018 Asian Games.

Head coach:  Roelant Oltmans

<li value=1>Imran Butt (GK)
<li value=3>Mubashar Ali
<li value=5>Toseeq Arshad
<li value=6>Rashid Mehmood
<li value=7>Muhammad Dilber
<li value=8>Muhammad Irfan
<li value=10>Ali Shan
<li value=11>Rizwan Ali (C)
<li value=12>Amjad Ali (GK)
<li value=13>Junaid Manzoor
<li value=14>Muhammad Umar Bhutta
<li value=16>Ammad Butt
<li value=17>Shafqat Rasool
<li value=18>Muhammad Atiq
<li value=20>Muhammad Faisal Qadir
<li value=23>Ajaz Ahmad
<li value=21>Tasawar Abbas
<li value=27>Abu Mahmood

{{fh|BAN}}
The following is the Bangladesh roster in the men's field hockey tournament of the 2018 Asian Games.

Head coach:  Gobinathan Krishnamurthy

<li value=1>Asim Gope (GK)
<li value=2>Mamunur Rahman Chayan
<li value=3>Farhad Shetul
<li value=4>Khorshadur Rahman
<li value=5>Imran Hasan
<li value=6>Roman Sarkar
<li value=7>Rashel Mahmud
<li value=8>Fazla Rabby
<li value=9>Milon Hossain
<li value=10>Mainul Islam
<li value=11>A.H.M. Kamruzzaman
<li value=12>Puskar Khisa
<li value=13>Sobuj Shohanur
<li value=14>Sarower Hossain
<li value=15>Naim Uddin
<li value=17>Ashraful Islam
<li value=19>Arshad Hossain
<li value=22>Abu Nippon (GK)

{{fh|OMA}}
The following is the Oman roster in the men's field hockey tournament of the 2018 Asian Games.

Head coach:  Tahir Zaman

<li value=1>Muhanna Al-Hasani
<li value=3>Ammaar Al-Shaaibi
<li value=5>Younis Al-Nofli
<li value=7>Qosim Al-Shibli
<li value=8>Mahmood Al-Hasni (C)
<li value=9>Asaad Mubarak Al-Qasmi
<li value=10>Marwan Al-Raiisi
<li value=11>Basim Khatar Rajab
<li value=12>Khalid Al-Shaaibi
<li value=15>Faisal Ambork Alloun
<li value=16>Salah Al-Saadi
<li value=21>Imad Al-Hasani
<li value=22>Fahad Al-Noufali (GK)
<li value=23>Rashad Al-Fazari
<li value=25>Ali Salim Al-Zadjali
<li value=26>Ibrahim Al-Farsi (GK)
<li value=27>Sami Al-Laun
<li value=30>Mahmood Bait Shamaiaa

{{fh|THA}}
The following is the Thailand roster in the men's field hockey tournament of the 2018 Asian Games.

Head coach:  Kim Kyung-soo

<li value=1>Suriphong Jongjum (GK)
<li value=2>Theerachai Sansamran
<li value=4>Thanop Kampanthong
<li value=5>Chakan Boonmee
<li value=6>Sadakorn Vimuttanon (C)
<li value=8>Aphiwat Thanperm
<li value=9>Nisman Maseela
<li value=12>Ratthawit Khamkong
<li value=16>Norrawich Intani
<li value=17>Seksit Samoechai
<li value=20>Borirak Harapan
<li value=21>Wallop Khamwong
<li value=24>Wirawat Singthong
<li value=26>Thanakrit Boon-Art
<li value=27>Wiros Yosiri
<li value=28>Adisuan Suphawong
<li value=29>Tanakit Juntakian
<li value=30>Sataporn Phakhunthod

{{fh|KAZ}}
The following is the Kazakhstan roster in the men's field hockey tournament of the 2018 Asian Games.

Head coach:  Olga Urmanova

[[Daulet Urmanov]]
<li value=2>[[Elomon Ortikboyev]]
<li value=5>[[Ilgam Abdulabayev]]
<li value=7>[[Meirlan Toibekov]]
<li value=8>[[Maxat Zhokenbayev]]
<li value=10>[[Yermek Tashkeyev]]
<li value=11>[[Miras Zhakanov]]
<li value=13>[[Adilzhan Kudaibergen]]
<li value=14>[[Arsen Podolyakin]]
<li value=15>[[Aman Yelubayev]]
<li value=16>[[Yerzhan Yelubayev]] (GK)
<li value=17>[[Nurbol Kozhym]]
<li value=20>[[Yerkebulan Dyussebekov]]
<li value=21>[[Tilek Uzbek]]
<li value=23>[[Nurzhan Mukhamadiyev]]
<li value=32>[[Lenur Vishnyakov]] (GK)
{{div col end}}<section end="Kazakhstan" />

References
{{reflist|30em}}

[[Category:Field hockey at the 2018 Asian Games – Men's tournament|Squads]]